April Fool is an American romantic comedy silent film released in 1926. The 67 minute black and white film with subtitles stars Baby Peggy, Alexander Carr and Duane Thompson. It was directed by Nat Ross.

Plot
The film concern about a worker struggling to make ends meet in a Jewish neighborhood in the city, his daughter, his love interest, and his daughter's prankster friend.

The main character loses his job pressing clothes in a tailor sweatshop and resorts to selling used umbrellas. His love interest is a widow who runs a deli where his daughter is looked after.

Cast
 Alexander Carr - Jacob Goodman
 Duane Thompson - Irma Goodman
 Mary Alden - Amelia Rosen
 Raymond Keane - Leon Steinfield
 Eddie Phillips - Joseph Applebaum
 Snitz Edwards - Mr. Applebaum
 Nat Carr - Moisha Ginsburg
 Baby Peggy - Irma Goodman, as a Child
 Pat Moore - Joe Applebaum, as a Child
 Leon Holmes - Leon Steinfield, as a Child

References

External links
 April Fool at IMDb.com
 

American romantic comedy films
1926 films
Films directed by Nat Ross
American black-and-white films
American silent feature films
1926 romantic comedy films
Films with screenplays by Edgar Allan Woolf
1920s American films
Silent romantic comedy films
Silent American comedy films